The  is the popular name for a portion of the Sanin Main Line in the suburbs of Kyoto, Japan. The electrified and double-tracked railway is a commuter rail line in the Osaka-Kobe-Kyoto Metropolitan Area, owned and operated by West Japan Railway Company (JR West). The line starts at Kyoto Station and ends at Sonobe Station.

The Sagano Line forms part of JR West's "Urban Network". This name has been in use since 1988.

Sagano Scenic Railway

The  is a sightseeing railway that uses an abandoned section of the Sanin Main Line originally built in 1897. In 1989, the Sanin Main Line was rerouted between the present day Saga-Arashiyama Station to Umahori to accommodate track duplication and electrification. However the old route which ran along the Hozu River, had been popular with tourists. The Sagano Scenic Railway, an affiliate of JR West and developed jointly with the city of Kameoka, was founded, and the Sagano Scenic Line began operation in 1991.

The track and stations were all formerly used by the Sanin Main Line and still owned by JR West, while the train is composed of a former JR West Class DE10 diesel locomotive and torokko open-sided cars (derived from the English "truck") converted from former freight gondola cars.

The Sagano Scenic Line stations are as follows (Sagano Line station in parentheses):
Torokko Saga (Saga Arashiyama) - Torokko Arashiyama - Torokko Hozukyo (Hozukyō) - Torokko Kameoka (Umahori)

Stations
All stations on the Sagano Line are located in Kyoto Prefecture
Rapid services stop at Kyoto, Nijo, Emmachi, Saga-Arashiyama, and every station from Kameoka to Sonobe.

References

Lines of West Japan Railway Company
Sanin Main Line
1067 mm gauge railways in Japan
Railway lines opened in 1897